The Napthine Ministry was the 68th ministry of the Government of Victoria. It was a Liberal–National Coalition Government, led by the Premier of Victoria, Denis Napthine, and Deputy Premier, Peter Ryan. It succeeded the Baillieu Ministry on 6 March 2013, following the resignation of Ted Baillieu from the Liberal Party leadership, and the election of Denis Napthine as Liberal Party leader and Premier. The Napthine Ministry consisted of 22 Ministers, most of which held multiple portfolios.

Napthine reshuffled his cabinet on 17 March 2014, after the announced retirements of Jeanette Powell, Hugh Delahunty, Nicholas Kotsiras and Peter Hall. After the defeat of the Napthine government at the 2014 state election, Daniel Andrews of the Australian Labor Party formed the First Andrews Ministry on 4 December 2014.

Ministry
Blue entries indicate members of the Liberal Party, and green entries indicate members of the National Party.

References

Victoria (Australia) ministries
Liberal Party of Australia ministries in Victoria (Australia)
Liberal Party of Australia
National Party of Australia
Cabinets established in 2013
Cabinets disestablished in 2014
Ministries of Elizabeth II
2013 establishments in Australia
2014 disestablishments in Australia